The Finnish-Islamic Congregation is an Islamic congregation which members are local Tatars. It was founded in 1925 and was the first Islamic congregation in Finland. The congregation has activity in Helsinki, Järvenpää, Kotka and Turku.

History 
The first Muslim people in Finland were Tatars. They arrived between the late 1800s and early 1900s as merchants from the Russian Empire. They were mainly Mishar Tatars, but some other Turkic peoples came as well, such as Bashkirs and Kazakhs. They blended in quickly because the first generation tended to identify themselves mostly through their religion (möselman).

After settling in the country, they shortly felt the need to organize officially. The predecessor to the congregation was created in 1915, and its name was Helsingin musulmaanien hyväntekeväisyysseura (The Charity Club of Helsinki Moslems). They often held their services at the house of Weli-Ahmed Hakim, who would also become a founding member and long-time imam of the congregation.

Due to laws at the time, these Muslim merchants could not establish an actual congregation in the beginning, but after the freedom of religion law was passed in 1922, it was possible. The congregation was officially registered in 1925.

The name of the congregation was at first Suomen muhamettilainen seurakunta (The Finnish Mohammedan Congregation). It was changed in 1963 to its current version. The first administration consisted of following people; Weli Ahmed Hakim, Ymär Abdrahim, Nur-Muhammed Ali, Ismael Arifulla and Imad Samaletdin. Imam-Hakim also became the first chairman of the congregation. He has later been named an honorary member.

During those times, the congregation was not yet officially only for Tatars, but back then, there were almost no other Muslims in the country.

Facilities 

At first, In 1941, the congregation acquired a house from the Helsinki street Fredrikinkatu. In 1948, it bought a wooden house located on the same street. In its place the current building was built between 1958–1961, designed by a Finnish man, Armas Lahtinen. The cost was 170 million Finnish Marks, and it was funded with loans and donations. The congregation received five million marks from Pakistan and Turkey, and 600,000 marks from Morocco. The congregation owns the entire building, though only a couple of floors are in use and the rest is rented. The Finnish Islamic Congregation is fairly wealthy and therefore does not require taxes from its members.
In addition to the main building in Helsinki, the congregation owns the Järvenpää Mosque and also chapels in Turku and Kotka. The Tatars in Tampere have their own congregation. The Finnish-Islamic Congregation has cemeteries in Hietaniemi (Helsinki) and Turku. Before losing the area, Viipuri (now Vyborg) also had a space for the deceased Muslims.

Orientation 
The Finnish Tatars are Sunni Muslims. It has been said, that they practice so called "liberal Islam", but at least one of the leaders of the congregation, Atik Ali does not accept given description. He says that there is only one Islam, and they also practice it - but many indeed have become secularized, while some are still more devout.

The congregation is heavily tied to the Tatar ethnic identity; it does not try to convert others and only accepts Tatars and their spouses (after a three year trial) as its members. Other Muslims can however come and pray during services.

Many descendants of the Finnish Tatars are now Christian due to mixed marriages. Older members of the community have been against mixing with others.

International guests visiting the congregation have been for example presidents Rustam Minnikhanov (Tatarstan) and Recep Tayyip Erdoğan (Turkey).

Chairmen 
 Weli-Ahmed Hakim (1926–1926)
 Kemal Baibulat (1926–1928)
 Ismail Arifulla (1928–1929)
 Zuhur Tahir (1929–1961)
 Osman Ali (1961–1982)
 Abdullah Ali (1982–1988)
 Okan Daher (1988–2012)
 Atik Ali (2012–2020)
 Gölten Bedretdin (2020–present)

See also 
 Tatars
 Finnish Tatars
 Järvenpää Mosque
 The Tampere Tatar Congregation
 European Islam
 Islam in Europe
 Islam in Finland

References

Further reading
 Kadriye Bedretdin (reporter): Tugan Tel - Kirjoituksia Suomen Tataareista. Suomen Itämainen Seura, Helsinki 2011. .
 Muazzez Baibulat: The Tampere Islamic Congregation: the roots and history. Gummerus Kirjapaino Oy, Jyväskylä 2004. .

External links 
 
 Documentary on the congregation
 Imam Ramil Bilal (Belyaev)

Finnish Tatars
Islamic organisations based in Finland
1925 establishments in Finland
Islamic organizations established in 1925